Istämi (or Dizabul or Ishtemi Sir Yabghu Khagan)
was the ruler of the western part of the Göktürks, which became the Western Turkic Khaganate and dominated the Sogdians. He was the yabgu (vassal) of his brother Bumin Qaghan in 552 AD. He was posthumously referred to as khagan in Turkic sources. His son was Tardu.

Activities 
During his rule Istami established diplomatic relations with the Persian and Byzantine Empires, defeated the Hepthalites, and acted as an elder statesman during the disintegration of the eastern half of the empire.  We know a great deal about him from the diplomatic missions of the Byzantine Empire.

Shortly after the smuggling of silkworm eggs into the Byzantine Empire from China by Nestorian Christian monks, the 6th-century Byzantine historian Menander Protector writes of how the Sogdians attempted to establish a direct trade of Chinese silk with the Byzantine Empire. After forming an alliance with the Sassanid ruler Khosrow I to defeat the Hephthalite Empire, Istämi was approached by Sogdian merchants requesting permission to seek an audience with the Sassanid king of kings for the privilege of traveling through Persian territories in order to trade with the Byzantines. Istämi refused the first request, but when he sanctioned the second one and had the Sogdian embassy sent to the Sassanid king, the latter had the members of the embassy poisoned to death. Maniah, a Sogdian diplomat, convinced Istämi to send an embassy directly to Byzantium's capital Constantinople, which arrived in 568 and offered not only silk as a gift to Byzantine ruler Justin II, but also proposed an alliance against Sassanid Persia. Justin II agreed and sent an embassy to the Turkic Khaganate, ensuring the direct silk trade desired by the Sogdians.

As the brother of Bumin he ruled the far-western region of their khanate. His son was Tardu.  As a Yabghu, he was autonomous and had de facto sovereignty while officially recognizing the authority of the qaghan. After Khushu's death he arranged the division of the territory into three realms east, central, and west and distributed them between Jotan, Arslan, and Shetu, respectively.

See also
Tardu
Tamgan

References

Further reading
 

Göktürk khagans
6th-century Turkic people
Ashina house of the Turkic Empire